Frans Pace (born 16 February 1962) is a Maltese sports shooter. He competed at the 1996 Summer Olympics and the 2000 Summer Olympics.

References

External links
 

1962 births
Living people
Maltese male sport shooters
Olympic shooters of Malta
Shooters at the 1996 Summer Olympics
Shooters at the 2000 Summer Olympics
Place of birth missing (living people)